Shiver Me (or My) Timbers may refer to:

Shiver my timbers, an exclamation
Shiver My Timbers (1931), an Our Gang short
Shiver Me Timbers! (1934), a Popeye the Sailor cartoon short
Shiver Me Timbers, a song on a 1974 studio album by Tom Waits